The 2019 Rajasthan State Men's League was the 1st season of the top tier state level football league in the Indian state of Rajasthan conducted by Rajasthan Football Association starting from 20 September 2019 with 8 participating teams and concluded on 6 October 2019. JECRC FC become 1st champions.
All matches were played on single venue Rajasthan University Sports Complex.

Teams
 Ajmer FC
 AU Rajasthan FC
 JECRC FC
 Mewar FC
 Neerja Modi FA
 Playspace FC 
 Poornima Panthers
 Zinc Football Academy

Standings

Matches

References

Football in Rajasthan